The Greenwood Gymnasium is a historic school building at 300 East Gary Street, on the campus of the Greenwood High School in Greenwood, Arkansas.  It is a large brick building, housing two classrooms, a gym space with bleachers and a stage, and locker rooms for boys and girls.  Its lobby is accessed via an entrance recessed behind a pair of round arches.  The gymnasium was built in 1938–39 with funding from the Works Progress Administration, and is a well-preserved and durable example of that project's work.

The building was listed on the National Register of Historic Places in 2011.

See also
National Register of Historic Places listings in Sebastian County, Arkansas

References

School buildings on the National Register of Historic Places in Arkansas
Buildings and structures in Sebastian County, Arkansas
National Register of Historic Places in Sebastian County, Arkansas